Bank Resalat Kerman Futsal Club is an Iranian futsal club based in Kerman.

History 
Zoghalsang Kerman Company bought Estandard Karaj FSC sports activities due to financial problems took over their license in 2006–07 Iran Futsal's 1st Division.The club was originally known as Zoghalsang Kerman. In the half season of 2008–09 Iranian Futsal Super League it was renamed Ashkan Kerman due to change of sponsorship. in the 2009–10 Iranian Futsal Super League they were renamed again to Heyat Football Kerman. in the 2010–11 Iran Futsal's 1st Division they were renamed to Siman Kerman. in the 2011–12 Iran Futsal's 1st Division they were renamed to Kaveh Zarand Kerman due to change of sponsorship. in the 2012–13 Iran Futsal's 1st Division it was bought Moghavemat Tehran license and renamed to Moghavemat Kerman. in the 2014–15 Iran Futsal's 1st Division they were renamed to Bank Resalat Kerman due to change of sponsorship.

Season-by-season 
The table below chronicles the achievements of the Club in various competitions.

Honours 
 Iran Futsal's 1st Division
 Champions (1): 2006-07

Famous players 
  Javad Asghari Moghaddam
  Amir Hanifi
  Majid Tikdarinejad

References 

Futsal clubs in Iran
Futsal clubs established in 2006
2006 establishments in Iran